Citipes (meaning "fleet-footed") is an extinct genus of caenagnathid dinosaurs known from the Late Cretaceous (Campanian aged) Dinosaur Park of southern Alberta, Canada. It lived about 76.9–75.8 million years ago. The specializations of the beak in Citipes and other caenagnathids suggest that they were herbivores. The type species, C. elegans had been previously placed within the genera Chirostenotes, Elmisaurus, Leptorhynchos and Ornithomimus.

History 
 
The holotype material, found in 1926 at the Little Sandhill Creek, was originally thought to belong to an ornithomimid; William Arthur Parks in 1933 assigned it to a new species of Ornithomimus: O. elegans. When its oviraptorosaurian nature was revealed around 1989, it was then referred to Chirostenotes or Elmisaurus. In 2013, Longrich et al. made it a second species of their new genus Leptorhynchos. Finally, in 2020, Gregory Funston gave it a genus of its own, Citipes; the name is a Latin word meaning "fleet-footed".

The holotype is a tarsometatarsus. A pair of associated ilia and a sacral vertebra have been referred, as have a pair of fused dentaries, a tibia, and several isolated metatarsals. Osteohistological analysis shows that it was smaller than contemporary caenagnathids, and it is distinguished by fusion of the foot bones.

Classification 
The phylogenetic analysis by Funston (2020) places Citipes as the sister taxon to Elmisaurus rarus within Caenagnathinae.

References 

Caenagnathids
Late Cretaceous dinosaurs of North America
Campanian genus first appearances
Campanian genus extinctions
Campanian life
Paleontology in Alberta
Fossil taxa described in 2020